Nepalgunj, also spelled Nepalganj, is a Sub-Metropolitan City in Banke District, Nepal. It lies on the Terai plains near the southern border with Bahraich district in Uttar Pradesh, India. Nepalgunj is 153 kilometers south-west of Ghorahi and 16 km south of Kohalpur. Former Village Development Committee: Udayapur, Bhawaniyapur, Piprahawa, Jaispur, Paraspur, Indrapur, Khaskarkado, Bashudevpur, Manikapur and Puraina were added to territory in order to make it Sub metropolitan city on 2071 Paush 28 and later Puraini was also added in list on 2072 Paush 21. Further, while restructuring of local levels nationwide, ward no. 23 (former Indrapur VDC) was taken out to Janaki Rural Municipality and ward no. 7 of Hirminiya VDC was added to Nepalgunj.

Demographics
At the time of the 2011 Nepal census, Nepalgunj Sub-Metropolitan City had a population of 141,241. Of these, 33.7% spoke Nepali, 30.7% Awadhi, 27.2% Urdu, 2.1% Hindi, 1.8% Tharu, 1.4% Maithili, 1.0% Newar, 0.6% Magar, 0.3% Doteli and 1.2% other languages as their first language.

In terms of ethnicity/caste, 28.2% were Musalman, 10.7% Chhetri, 8.6% Hill Brahmin, 4.0% Thakuri, 3.7% Magar, 3.5% Yadav, 3.2% Tharu, 3.0% Newar, 3.0% Kathabaniyan and 32.1% others.

In terms of religion, 70.0% were Hindu, 27.8% Muslim, 1.1% Buddhist, 0.8% Christian, 0.1% Kirati and 0.2% others.

Culture
Nepalgunj has a diverse culture with people from different faiths living within mixed communities. Hinduism and Buddhism are two major religions in the city, with Hindus comprising the larger percentage of the population. The city also has followers of other religions like Islam, Sikhism and Christianity. People of different ethnicity are known to have traditionally lived together, without any significant conflicts.

However, recent conflict occurred in December 2006 between the Pahari people and the Madhesi people, following immediately after the 2006 democracy movement in Nepal. The conflict resulted in the death of at least one person, while dozens of others were injured.

Transport

Nepalgunj Airport is located 6 km north of the city centre. The airport was officially named Mahendra Airport after the late King Mahendra, but it is commonly referred to as Ranjha Airport. It operated flights to Kathmandu and to airports in less-developed western districts such as Humla, Dolpa, Jumla, Mugu and Rukum. Nepalgunj airport is the gateway for pilgrims headed to Mt Kailash in Tibet via the Simikot-Hilsa route in Humla district, which, following the 2015 earthquake in Nepal, has become the dominant route for Kailash pilgrimage through Nepal. 

Nepalgunj airport is undergoing major redevelopment, and by 2025 its capacity will be increased and will have world-class facilities inside the airport for the customers. Nepalgunj to Kohalpur highway has been widened to four lanes and it is considered to be one of the best in the country. This has made journey to Kolhapur and easy access for commuters and visitors.Nepalgunj has bus and mini-bus services. The country's longest highway, Mahendra Highway, runs through the town of Kohalpur, 10 kilometers from Nepalgunj city center.

An Indian Railways line reaches Rupaidiha across the border. It involves train changes at Gonda, Bahraich and Nanpara. For travellers coming in from India it is also possible to take an express train to Lucknow and from there a direct bus to Rupaidiha. Indian and Nepalese nationals may cross the border without restrictions; however, there is a customs checkpoint for goods and third country nationals.

Infrastructure

Hospitals 

 Bheri Zonal Hospital
 Nepalgunj Medical College Teaching Hospital
 Western Hospital Pvt. Ltd.
 Fateh Bal Eye Hospital
 Sushil Koirala Prakhar Cancer Hospital
 Lions Dental Hospital

Schools 
Nepalgunj has several boarding and government-run schools. Mahendra Multiple Campus is the largest public higher-level institution in the district, and is affiliated to Tribhuvan University.

Communications 
 A Post Office is located at Charbahini Chok 
 Telephone networks (land lines) including telephone exchange systems
 Mobile phone networks
 Cable television physical networks including receiving stations and cable distribution networks
 Internet services

Climate
Nepalgunj has a sub-tropical climate. Temperatures sometimes exceed  from April to June. During the rainy season—arriving in June and lasting into September—it is less hot but sometimes very humid. Winter is usually pleasant while the sun is out. It sometimes is foggy and overcast; then it can be chilly with temperatures below  but no frost.

Hotels
With the boost in the tourism industry after the change in political scenario of Nepal in the 1950s, the hotel and restaurant industries in Nepalgunj have experienced significant growth. Some hotels of the city feature in the atmospheric travel memoir A Glimpse of Eternal Snows by Jane Wilson-Howarth.

Places of interest

 Bageshwori Temple
 Banke National Park
 Manpur Mainapokhar is half an hour drive to travel Badhiya Lake
 Bardia National Park is an hour's drive west
 Karnali River is a 90 minutes drive west
 Tharu villages in Deukhuri Valley to the west along the Mahendra Rajmarg
 Surkhet, an Inner Terai Valley north of Nepalgunj

Sports
Cricket and association football are the two most popular sports in Nepalgunj. Most of the city's big sports tournaments are held in the city's football stadium and gymnasium. , an international cricket stadium is under construction in Kohalpur.

Media 
Two cinema halls, Laxmi hall and QFX Bageshwori, can be found in Nepalgunj. The city also has several community radio stations:
 Radio Sadvab " Sabai ko Radio " 91.2 MHz 
 Radio Himal 92.6 MHz (close)
 Nepalgunj Community FM 104.8 MHz
 Bheri FM 105.4 MHz
 Radio Krishnasar 94 MHz
 Radio Bageshwori 94.6 MHz
 Bheri Awaj FM 95.6 MHz (close)
 Morning Star 90.0 MHz
 DAINIK Nepalgunj National newspaper
 www.nepalgunjnews.com

Fashion Industry 
Although Nepalgunj is mainly known for its trade links with India, nevertheless it is rich in art and cultural heritage.
As a place transitions from being rural to urban in characteristics, there is a change in the cultural tastes.
With the advent of new-age technology, traditional theatres of days-goneby have given way to modern multiplexes.
Twentieth century has witnessed the advent of beauty pageants. And Nepal is no exception to the changes happening at the global level.

Miss Nepal Beauty Pageant, an annual beauty contest for women in Nepal has been organized in Nepal since 1994.
Miss Ruby Rana from Birgunj was the first titleholder. Notable participants from Nepalgunj like Miss Nisha Mishra have been runner ups and been very close to winning the contest.
As the economy of the city is growing, the people's aspirations are continuously growing and greater participation of people 
is expected in upcoming days.

See also
 Ghorahi
 Kohalpur
 Surkhet

References

External links

Populated places in Banke District
Transit and customs posts along the India–Nepal border
Points for exit and entry of nationals from third countries along the India–Nepal border
Nepal municipalities established in 1962
Submetropolitan municipalities of Nepal